Yuan Yuan (born 1993) is a Chinese wrestler who participated at the 2010 Summer Youth Olympics in Singapore. She won the silver medal in the girls' freestyle 52 kg event, losing to Patimat Bagomedova of Azerbaijan in the final.

References 

Wrestlers at the 2010 Summer Youth Olympics
Living people
Year of birth missing (living people)
20th-century Chinese women
21st-century Chinese women